Brachypalpus zugmayeriae is a species of hoverfly in the family Syrphidae.

Distribution
Caucasus.

References

Eristalinae
Insects described in 1887
Diptera of Asia